Portrait of Sinatra – Forty Songs from the Life of a Man is a 1977 compilation (Gatefold) album by Frank Sinatra that consists of 40 songs that were recorded for Reprise Records.  It spent a total of eighteen non-consecutive weeks in the UK Albums Chart, reaching number-one for two weeks on 2 April 1977. It became Sinatra's fourth album to top the British charts, his first since 1957's A Swingin' Affair! to claim pole position, and also his most recent chart-topping album in the UK.

The sleeve design was illustrated by English portrait painter Michael Noakes, who won a platinum disc for his work. The artwork on the back cover of the gatefold album shows an outline charcoal drawing of Sinatra's face; one of the inside sleeves shows a partially painted version of that same outline charcoal drawing; the other inside sleeve lists the album's tracks and several tributes to Sinatra from artistes such as Frankie Valli, Hoagy Carmichael; Bing Crosby, Nelson Riddle, Count Basie and Antonio Carlos Jobim; and the front cover itself shows the fully completed portrait of Sinatra's face. The album was not issued in the U.S & has never had an official release on CD in the UK.

Track listing

Disc one
 "Let's Face the Music and Dance" 
 "Nancy (With the Laughing Face)" - 2:31
 "I've Got You Under My Skin" - 3:26
 "Let Me Try Again (Laisse Moi Le Temps)" - 3:31
 "Fly Me to the Moon" - 2:29
 "All or Nothing at All" - 3:57
 "For Once in My Life" - 2:50
 "Bonita" - 3:39
 "My Kind of Town" - 3:10
 "Call Me Irresponsible" - 2:56

Disc two
 "All the Way" - 3:26
 "Strangers in the Night" - 2:36
 "Didn't We?"
 "Come Fly with Me" - 3:11
 "The Second Time Around" - 3:03
 "In the Wee Small Hours of the Morning" - 2:53
 "Bad, Bad Leroy Brown"
 "Softly, as I Leave You"
 "Cycles"
 "Send in the Clowns" - 3:39

Disc three
 "That's Life" - 3:07
 "Little Green Apples" - 5:00
 "The Song of the Sabiá"
 "Goody Goody" - 1:47
 "Empty Tables"
 "I Believe I'm Gonna Love You"
 "Stargazer"
 "I Sing the Songs (I Write the Songs)"
 "You Are the Sunshine of My Life" - 2:37
 "It Was a Very Good Year" - 4:25

Disc four
 "Somethin' Stupid" (with Nancy Sinatra) - 2:45
 "Young at Heart" - 2:52
 "You Make Me Feel So Young" - 3:21
 "Yesterday" - 3:56
 "Pennies from Heaven"
 "If"
 "Something" - 3:34
 "Star!"
 "Love's Been Good to Me"
 "My Way" - 4:35

Charts

Weekly charts

Year-end charts

Certifications and sales

References

1977 compilation albums
Frank Sinatra compilation albums
Reprise Records compilation albums